"Shockwave" is a song by American heavy metal band Black Tide. It is credited to Gabriel Garcia, Alexander Nuñez and Raul Garcia Jr. It was the first track and first single from their 2008 debut album Light from Above, with the other two singles being "Warriors of Time" and "Shout". It was released before the album. Today it is one of the band's most famous songs and has been played live on almost all of the band's concerts, also it was performed on Jimmy Kimmel Live! on March 27, 2008. It charted only in the US at number #25. The CD Single was the band's first official release and is also known as the "Black Tide EP". The single version is a clean edit of the song, the word "fuck" that is mentioned in the chorus is removed.

Music video
Two music videos were made for the song and both were aired on MTV2's Headbangers Ball.

The first was directed by Travis Kopach and features the band playing and trashing a house along with some fans. Later the Police comes and everybody escapes the house. At the beginning Vocalist/Guitarist Gabriel Garcia hangs in a lamp from the ceiling. That picture later became the cover for their E.P Road Warrior.
A  second video was also made and is a compilation of live scenes from Ozzfest 2007 and backstage footage. It was directed by Jason Bergh

In popular culture
 "Shockwave" is featured on the PlayStation 3 and Xbox 360 video game Skate 2, the North American version of Guitar Hero: Modern Hits, and is also available as a downloadable song for the PlayStation 3, Wii, and Xbox 360 versions of Rock Band.

Track listing

CD Single

Digital Single

Black Tide EP

Chart positions

Personnel
 Gabriel Garcia: vocals, lead guitar
 Alex Nuñez: rhythm guitar, backing vocals
 Zakk Sandler: Bass guitar, backing vocals
 Steven Spence: drums, percussion

References

2007 songs
Black Tide songs
Song recordings produced by Johnny K